Trient is also the German name for the city of Trento, Italy

Trient is a municipality in the district of Martigny in the canton of Valais in Switzerland.

History
In 1900 the municipality was created, when it separated from Martigny-Combe.

Geography

Of this area, 12.4% is used for agricultural purposes, while 31.2% is forested. Of the rest of the land, 0.8% is settled (buildings or roads) and 55.6% is unproductive land.

Coat of arms
The blazon of the municipal coat of arms is Azure on a plane in front of mountains Vert a Chamois statant Argent.

Demographics

, 6.2% of the population are resident foreign nationals. Over the last 10 years (2000–2010 ) the population has changed at a rate of 3.5%. It has changed at a rate of 2.8% due to migration and at a rate of 1.4% due to births and deaths.

Most of the population speaks French (125 or 96.2%) as their first language, German is the second most common (2 or 1.5%) and Portuguese is the third (2 or 1.5%).

, the population was 47.6% male and 52.4% female.  The population was made up of 64 Swiss men (43.5% of the population) and 6 (4.1%) non-Swiss men.  There were 73 Swiss women (49.7%) and 4 (2.7%) non-Swiss women.  Of the population in the municipality, 53 or about 40.8% were born in Trient and lived there in 2000.  There were 45 or 34.6% who were born in the same canton, while 17 or 13.1% were born somewhere else in Switzerland, and 11 or 8.5% were born outside of Switzerland.

, children and teenagers (0–19 years old) make up 28.5% of the population, while adults (20–64 years old) make up 54.6% and seniors (over 64 years old) make up 16.9%.

, there were 53 people who were single and never married in the municipality.  There were 67 married individuals, 6 widows or widowers and 4 individuals who are divorced.

, there were 51 private households in the municipality, and an average of 2.5 persons per household.  There were 13 households that consist of only one person and 7 households with five or more people.  , a total of 49 apartments (36.6% of the total) were permanently occupied, while 66 apartments (49.3%) were seasonally occupied and 19 apartments (14.2%) were empty.  The vacancy rate for the municipality, was 1.48%.

The historical population is given in the following chart:

Politics
In the 2007 federal election the most popular party was the FDP which received 39.31% of the vote.  The next three most popular parties were the CVP (25.96%), the SP (12.43%) and the SVP (12.43%).  In the federal election, a total of 83 votes were cast, and the voter turnout was 76.1%.

The voter participation was 62.6%, which is much more than the cantonal average of 54.67%. In the 2007 Swiss Council of States election a total of 72 votes were cast, of which 5 or about 6.9% were invalid. The voter participation was 77.4%, which is much more than the cantonal average of 59.88%.

Economy
, Trient had an unemployment rate of 5.3%.  , there were 4 people employed in the primary economic sector and about 2 businesses involved in this sector.  8 people were employed in the secondary sector and there were 2 businesses in this sector.  25 people were employed in the tertiary sector, with 6 businesses in this sector.  There were 55 residents of the municipality who were employed in some capacity, of which females made up 43.6% of the workforce.

 the total number of full-time equivalent jobs was 32.  The number of jobs in the primary sector was 2, all of which were in agriculture.  The number of jobs in the secondary sector was 8 of which 1 was in manufacturing and 7 (87.5%) were in construction.  The number of jobs in the tertiary sector was 22.  In the tertiary sector; 18 or 81.8% were in a hotel or restaurant, 2 or 9.1% were in education.

, there were 12 workers who commuted into the municipality and 31 workers who commuted away.  The municipality is a net exporter of workers, with about 2.6 workers leaving the municipality for every one entering.  Of the working population, 3.6% used public transportation to get to work, and 67.3% used a private car.

Religion

Of the rest of the population, there was 1 member of an Orthodox church.  2 (or about 1.54% of the population) belonged to no church, are agnostic or atheist, and 8 individuals (or about 6.15% of the population) did not answer the question.

Education
In Trient about 55 or (42.3%) of the population have completed non-mandatory upper secondary education, and 7 or (5.4%) have completed additional higher education (either university or a Fachhochschule).  Of the 7 who completed tertiary schooling, 85.7% were Swiss men, 14.3% were Swiss women.

, there were 6 students from Trient who attended schools outside the municipality.

References

External links

 Official website 

Municipalities of Valais